Alexandra Hetherington Breckenridge is an American actress. She began her career with supporting roles in the teen comedy films Big Fat Liar (2002) and She's the Man (2006). She later played reporter Willa McPherson in the FX series Dirt and had a supporting role in the short-lived series The Ex List. She starred as a young Moira O'Hara in the first season of FX's American Horror Story, and played Kaylee in the third season. She played Jessie Anderson in the AMC series The Walking Dead and Sophie in the NBC series This Is Us. She is also the voice of various characters in the animated comedy series Family Guy. Since 2019, she has starred as Melinda "Mel" Monroe in the Netflix series Virgin River.

Early life
Breckenridge lived in Darien, Connecticut, until the age of 10, when she and her mother moved to California, where they moved around for a year before settling in Mill Valley. Breckenridge became interested in acting, photography, and singing at age 13. When she was 15, she moved with her mother back to Los Angeles to pursue her acting career.

Career

In 2000, Breckenridge guest starred as Shelly Weaver in Freaks and Geeks. She also guest starred in Buffy the Vampire Slayer, Charmed, CSI: Crime Scene Investigation, Dawson's Creek, JAG, Medium, Psych, and Undeclared. Breckenridge also guest-starred as Francise in three episodes of Opposite Sex. In 2002, she appeared in the film Big Fat Liar, starring Frankie Muniz, as Jason Shepherd's older sister Janie.

Breckenridge has had numerous voice roles in the animated television series Family Guy. During an interview with FHM, she stated: "When I first went for Family Guy, I auditioned for a guest voice. I don't know why, but [creator] Seth MacFarlane really likes the sound of my voice. I'll never understand that. He just liked me and they call me back all the time to do different things." Breckenridge often does celebrity impressions in the series, such as Sarah Jessica Parker and Renée Zellweger. She also had roles in MacFarlane's web series Cavalcade of Cartoon Comedy. Breckenridge also guest starred in the episode "With Friends Like Steve's" of American Dad!, also created by MacFarlane.

In 2006, Breckenridge starred as Monique in the film She's the Man. She has also appeared in a couple of series that have later been canceled, such as the FX drama series Dirt from 2007 to 2008, in which she played Willa McPherson, a young upstart writer. In 2009, Breckenridge co-starred in the independent film The Bridge to Nowhere, directed by Blair Underwood. In 2012, she had a role in the film Ticket Out.

In 2011 Breckenridge had a recurring role in season four of HBO's True Blood as Katerina Pelham and also in season one of FX's American Horror Story as young Moira O'Hara, the ghost of a maid trapped in the house in which she was employed. In addition, she returned for two episodes in season three of the series, Coven, as Kaylee, a young witch who excels in pyrokinesis.

From 2015 to 2016, Breckenridge portrayed Jessie Anderson, a character from the comic book series of the same name, in season five and season six of the AMC post-apocalyptic horror series The Walking Dead. In 2015, she co-starred in the psychological thriller Dark from executive producer Joe Dante and director Nick Basile. In 2017, Breckenridge appeared in the recurring role of Sophie, Kate's childhood friend and Kevin's ex-wife, in the first season of the NBC drama series This Is Us. She was promoted to a series regular for the second season, and appeared in one episode in the third season two episodes in the fourth season, one episode in the fifth season, and the final sixth season 

Since 2019, Breckenridge has played lead character Melinda "Mel" Monroe, a nurse-midwife who moves to a small northern California town following a personal tragedy, in the Netflix series Virgin River. The series was renewed for fourth and fifth seasons by Netflix in September 2021.

Personal life
Breckenridge married guitarist Casey Hooper in September 2015. They had their first child, a son, in September 2016. Their second child, a daughter, was born in December 2017.

Breckenridge is the niece of actor Michael Weatherly. She has several tattoos that are covered by make-up for her on-screen projects, but not during photo shoots.

Filmography

Film

Television

References

External links

 
 

20th-century American actresses
21st-century American actresses
Actresses from Bridgeport, Connecticut
Actresses from California
American film actresses
American television actresses
American voice actresses
Living people
People from Darien, Connecticut
Year of birth missing (living people)